The 1959 East Carolina Pirates football team was an American football team that represented East Carolina College (now known as East Carolina University) as a member of the North State Conference during the 1959 NAIA football season. In their eighth season under head coach Jack Boone, the team compiled a 5–6 record.

Schedule

References

East Carolina
East Carolina Pirates football seasons
East Carolina Pirates football